Pool D of the 2016 Fed Cup Europe/Africa Group III was one of four pools in the Europe/Africa Group III of the 2016 Fed Cup. Five teams competed in a round robin competition, with the top team and bottom teams proceeding to their respective sections of the play-offs: the top team played for advancement to Group II.

Standings

Round-robin

Montenegro vs. Kosovo

Norway vs. Morocco

Montenegro vs. Norway

Morocco vs. Mozambique

Norway vs. Kosovo

Montenegro vs. Mozambique

Morocco vs. Kosovo

Norway vs. Mozambique

Montenegro vs. Morocco

Kosovo vs. Mozambique

See also
Fed Cup structure

References

External links
 Fed Cup website

A3